The Theater at Madison Square Garden is a theater located in New York City's Madison Square Garden. It seats between 2,000 and 5,600, and is used for concerts, shows, sports, meetings, and other events.  It is located beneath the main Madison Square Garden arena that hosts MSG's larger events.

History
When the Garden opened in 1968, the theater was known as the Felt Forum, in honor of then-president Irving Mitchell Felt. In the early 1990s, at the behest of then-owner Paramount Communications, the theater was renamed the Paramount Theater after the Paramount Theatre in Times Square had been converted to an office tower. The theater received its next name, The Theater at Madison Square Garden, in the mid-1990s, after Viacom bought Paramount and sold the MSG properties. In 2007, the theater was renamed the WaMu Theater at Madison Square Garden through a naming rights deal with Washington Mutual. After Washington Mutual's collapse in 2009, the name reverted to The Theater at Madison Square Garden. In 2018, the theater signed a deal with Hulu to become the "Hulu Theater at Madison Square Garden". In 2023, the theater reverted to the name "The Theater at Madison Square Garden".

Structure
Due to its location beneath the main Madison Square Garden arena, the theater has a relatively low  ceiling at stage level. All of its seating except for boxes on the two side walls is on one level slanted back from the stage. There is an  lobby at the theater.

Events
It was the host for Mike Tyson's fourteenth professional fight against Sammy Scaff on December 6, 1985. The theater occasionally hosts boxing matches on nights when the main arena is unavailable, or fights between promising boxers who management believe will not fill up "the big room". Notable fights include Sergio Martínez vs. Matthew Macklin in 2012, Vasiliy Lomachenko vs. Guillermo Rigondeaux in 2017, and Teófimo López vs. George Kambosos Jr. in 2021.

Music band Menudo's February 5, 1983, concert at Madison Square Garden was held at the Felt Forum. It was member Xavier Serbia's last official concert with the band (he would return to the band in 1983 for another Madison Square Garden show to substitute for an ill Ricky Melendez) and the first for member Ray Reyes. This concert was transmitted live to most Latin American countries, including Argentina, Brazil, Chile, Colombia, Costa Rica, Ecuador, El Salvador, Guatemala, Honduras, Mexico, Nicaragua, Panama, Peru, Puerto Rico, the Dominican Republic, Uruguay and Venezuela, and to the United States.

In October 21–22, 1986, Philippine singer Sharon Cuneta performed her New York concert as part of her U.S. concert tour and received a standing ovation. This was also together with the taping of her latest movie Jack and Jill sa Amerika featuring the cities visited during the tour included as a story plot in the movie. The New York concert at the Felt Forum was opposite Elton John's concert at Madison. The October 19 Shrine Auditorium Los Angeles concert caused a traffic jam. As Sharon became the first Filipina artist to sell out the Shrine, Mayor Bradley
bestowed the Official Honorary Welcome Key to the City of Los Angeles. While in L.A. there were plans for a record deal from executives as guests watching the L.A. concert. Upon return to the Philippines she continued her television variety The Sharon Cuneta Show on ABS-CBN channel 2. On the third show also featuring Zsa Zsa Padilla and Kuh Ledesma in 1986 she discussed her American schedule from East to West including Washington D.C. San Diego and San Francisco. TSCS ran from 1986 to 1997 as the Sunday night staple which also aired on Los Angeles Channel 18, however on Sunday afternoon. Also a VHS was planned from highlights of the various U.S. concerts.

In 1987, the comedy concert film Eddie Murphy Raw was filmed at the Forum and released in December of that year.

On December 8, 1991, the draw for the 1994 FIFA World Cup qualification was held at the theater.

WCW held two live events there, one on April 13, 1993, marking the first time an WCW event was ever held in New York City, and again on June 30, 1996. NXT held one event in the theater on November 16, 2016. Lucha Libre AAA and Impact Wrestling hosted Lucha Invades NY on September 15, 2019.

An annual staging of The Wizard of Oz played at the theater from 1997 to 1999. Notable actors in the musical included Roseanne Barr, Eartha Kitt, and Jo Anne Worley as the Wicked Witch of the West; Mickey Rooney as the Wizard, and Ken Page and Lara Teeter as the Cowardly Lion and Scarecrow, respectively.

The theater was home to an annual staging of A Christmas Carol from 1994 to 2003.

In 2001, the national tour of Rodgers and Hammerstein's Cinderella starring Jamie-Lynn Sigler in the title role, Eartha Kitt as the Fairy Godmother, and Paolo Montalbán as Prince Christopher played at the theater.

In 2003, popular Australian children's group The Wiggles performed a record 12 sold-out shows in a row at the theater, breaking the previous record held by Bruce Springsteen. The current record belongs to Billy Joel, who has sold out more than 76 consecutive shows at the theater.

In 2004, it served as the venue of the Survivor: All-Stars finale.
It was also the home for wheel of fortune nyc week back in the 90s

In 2005 and 2011, Peter Pan starring Cathy Rigby in the title role returned to New York City at the theater.

It was the home of the NFL draft from 1995 until 2004. In 2005, the NFL Draft moved to the Jacob K. Javits Convention Center, after MSG management opposed a new stadium for the New York Jets. It also hosted the NBA draft from 2001 to 2010.

From 2004 to 2006 and in 2008 Theatre of MSG hosted the Jammy Award honoring improvisational music.

In 2013, A Christmas Story: The Musical was revived at the theater for a limited engagement.

The first-ever mixed martial arts event held at the theater was World Series of Fighting 34: Gaethje vs. Firmino on December 31, 2016.

The first darts event held at the theater was the 2022 US Darts Masters.

In 2021, the theater also hosted two Verzuz hip-hop battles: The Lox against DipSet and Fat Joe against Ja Rule.

The theater also hosted its first Esports event in 2022 with the main event group stage and quarterfinals of the League of Legends World Championship.

References

Madison Square Garden
Madison Square Garden Sports
Concert halls in New York City
Music venues in Manhattan
Pennsylvania Plaza
Theatres in Manhattan
1968 establishments in New York City
Event venues established in 1968
Former Viacom subsidiaries
Grammy Award venues
Hulu